Sollathaan Ninaikkiren is a 1973 Indian Tamil-language film, written and directed by K. Balachander. Starring S. V. Subbaiah, Sivakumar, Kamal Haasan, Jayachitra, Srividya, Shubha and Jayasudha, it is based on the novel Ilavu Kaatha Kili by Manian. The film was released on 7 December 1973. It was remade in Telugu as Ammayilu Jagratha. Balachander remade the film in Kannada as Sundara Swapnagalu.

Plot 

Kamala, Manjula and Pushpa are sisters, each getting attracted to Raghavan, their tenant. Raghavan falls in love with Pushpa. However, things take a turn for the worse, when Pushpa sacrifices herself to the whims of Kamal, a playboy, to save her friend Sudha from his exploits. The three sisters ultimately marry other men, while Raghavan remains unmarried.

Cast 
 S. V. Subbaiah as Sivaraman
 Sivakumar as Raghavan
 Kamal Haasan as Kamal
 Jayachitra as Pushpa
 Srividya as Kamala
 Shubha as Manjula
 Jayasudha as Sudha
 Poornam Viswanathan as Sudha's husband
 Master Sekhar as Kamal's brother

Production 
Sollathaan Ninaikkiren is based on the novel Ilavu Kaatha Kili by Manian. The novel had been performed over 100 times as a stage play. The novel was later made into a film by Manian and 'Vidhwan' Ve. Lakshmanan under the production banner Udhayam Productions. Thangappan Master was initially hired as the dance choreographer, but as K. Balachander objected to whom Kamal Haasan called "the traditional cinema dance master", and wanted a younger man, Haasan hired Raghuram. Haasan worked as an assistant director of this film.

Soundtrack 
The music was composed by M. S. Viswanathan, with lyrics by Vaali.

Release and reception 
Sollathaan Ninaikkiren was released on 7 December 1973. Ananda Vikatan, in a review dated 30 December 1973, positively reviewed the film for Balachander's writing and the cast performances. Kanthan of Kalki also liked the film. The film was remade in Telugu as Ammayilu Jagratha. Balachander remade the film in Kannada as Sundara Swapnagalu.

Legacy 
The title of the film inspired a television series of same name, also produced by K. Balachander for Zee Tamil.

References

External links 
 

1970s Tamil-language films
1973 drama films
1973 films
Films based on Indian novels
Films directed by K. Balachander
Films scored by M. S. Viswanathan
Films with screenplays by K. Balachander
Indian black-and-white films
Indian drama films
Tamil films remade in other languages